The 1984 WTA German Open was a women's tennis tournament played on outdoor clay courts in West Berlin, West Germany that was part of the 1984 Virginia Slims World Championship Series. It was the 15th edition of the tournament and was held from 14 May through 20 May 1984. Sixth-seeded Claudia Kohde-Kilsch won the singles title and earned $27,500 first-prize money.

Finals

Singles
 Claudia Kohde-Kilsch defeated  Kathleen Horvath 7–6, 6–1
 It was Kohde-Kilsch's 3rd title of the year and the 9th of her career.

Doubles
 Anne Hobbs /  Candy Reynolds defeated  Kathleen Horvath /  Virginia Ruzici 6–3, 4–6, 7–6
 It was Hobbs' 2nd title of the year and the 8th of her career. It was Reynolds' 2nd title of the year and the 19th of her career.

References

External links
 ITF tournament edition details

German Open
WTA German Open
1984 in German tennis